Čekovce  is a village and municipality in the Krupina District of the Banská Bystrica Region of Slovakia.

History
In historical records, the village was first mentioned in 1391 (Cheke). It belonged to Bzovík, and in the 17th century to Esztergom' Seminary.

Genealogical resources

The records for genealogical research are available at the state archive "Statny Archiv in Banska Bystrica, Slovakia"

 Roman Catholic church records (births/marriages/deaths): 1686-1895 (parish B)
 Lutheran church records (births/marriages/deaths): 1757-1873 (parish B)

See also
 List of municipalities and towns in Slovakia

External links
 
http://www.statistics.sk/mosmis/eng/run.html.  
http://www.e-obce.sk/obec/cekovce/cekovce.html
Surnames of living people in Cekovce

Villages and municipalities in Krupina District